Adam of Łowicz (also "Adam of Bocheń" and "Adamus Polonus"; born in Bocheń, near Łowicz, Poland; died 7 February 1514, in Kraków, Poland) was a professor of medicine at the University of Krakow, its rector in 1510–1511, a humanist, writer and philosopher.

Life
Adam studied in the Department of Liberal Arts at the University of Krakow, earning a baccalaureate in 1488 and a master's degree in 1492. He then studied medicine in Italy. Returning to Poland, he served as court physician to Kings Jan I Olbracht, Alexander Jagiellon and Zygmunt I. In 1510 and 1511 he was twice elected rector of the University of Krakow. He opposed the clergy's dominance over the secular estate. An unconventional thinker, he hypothesized the immortality of humankind.

In the early sixteenth century, Plato had become a model for philosophy in Italy, especially in Medicean Florence. In some ways he was represented in Poland by Adam of Łowicz, author of Conversations about Immortality.

Works
Fundamentum scienciae nobilissimae secretorum naturae (1489; alchemy).
Dialogus... de quattuor statuum... immortalitatem contentione (Conversations... about Immortality, ca. 1507).

Memorial
In 1964, a memorial plaque in his honor was unveiled in Bocheń.

See also
Physician writer
List of Poles
History of philosophy in Poland

Notes

References
Henryk Barycz, "Adam z Bochynia, inaczej zwany z Łowicza (zm. w 1514 r.)" ("Adam of Bochyń, also known as Adam of Łowicz; died 1514)," Polski słownik biograficzny (Polish Biographical Dictionary), vol. I, Kraków, 1935, pp. 20–21.
 Władysław Tatarkiewicz, Zarys dziejów filozofii w Polsce (A Brief History of Philosophy in Poland), [in the series:] Historia nauki polskiej w monografiach (History of Polish Learning in Monographs), [volume] XXXII, Kraków, Polska Akademia Umiejętności (Polish Academy of Learning), 1948. This monograph draws from pertinent sections in earlier editions of the author's Historia filozofii (History of Philosophy).
"Adam z Łowicza" ("Adam of Łowicz"), Encyklopedia Polski, Kraków, Wydawnictwo Ryszard Kluszczyński, 1996, p. 11.

Year of birth unknown
1514 deaths
Jagiellonian University alumni
16th-century philosophers
Medieval Polish physicians
16th-century Polish physicians
Polish Renaissance humanists
Academic staff of Jagiellonian University
Rectors of the Jagiellonian University
15th-century Polish people
Polish alchemists
15th-century Polish physicians
16th-century occultists
Medieval occultists
16th-century Polish writers
16th-century male writers
15th-century Polish writers
15th-century Latin writers
16th-century Latin-language writers
15th-century alchemists
16th-century alchemists
16th-century Polish philosophers